SS (RMS) Mona's Isle (III), No. 76304, the third ship in the company's history to be so named, was a paddle steamer which served with the Isle of Man Steam Packet Company until she was purchased by The Admiralty in 1915.

Construction & dimensions
Mona's Isle was constructed by Caird & Co. at Greenock and was launched on Tuesday, 16 May 1882.
Caird & Co. also supplied her engines and boilers.

Length 330'7"; beam 38'1"; depth 15'1". Mona's Isle had accommodation for a crew of 56, and was certificated to carry 1,561 passengers. Her engines developed 4,500 i.h.p. which gave her a service speed of 18 knots.

The engines were quite remarkable for their day. The oscillating engine had slowly developed from low pressure jet condensing with all the demerits that salt water intake involved, to higher pressure surface condensing that was the forerunner of the turbine circulating system. These were the first high-pressure engines of this type to be adopted by the Steam Packet Company. They worked at a boiler pressure of 90 p.s.i. The stroke was 90 inches with the high-pressure cylinder 65 inches in diameter and the low-pressure cylinder 112 inches. The low-pressure cylinder was said to be larger and heavier than any other fitted to a paddle steamer.

Service life
Mona's Isle was said to be the largest, best appointed, and most expensive steamer in the company's history up to that time. Exceptionally fast in her day, she could reach Liverpool from Douglas in only 3hr. 55min. She was the first of five rather similar paddle-steamers added to the fleet between 1882 and 1889.

On Thursday 19 June 1884, Mona’s Isle suffered a mechanical failure; one of her cylinders and a piston rod being damaged. Departing Liverpool at 13:05hrs with approximately 250 passengers embarked,  Mona’s Isle cleared the Victoria Channel and set a course bound for Douglas. She passed the Tynwald, which was engaged in accompanying yachts racing in the Mersey, at 14:30hrs which reported her to be making good speed. When approximately mid-channel the mechanical failure to her machinery occurred, forcing her Master, Capt. McQueen, to come to anchor and await the arrival of assistance. As there was no wireless communication at that time, anxiety was caused in Douglas as the scheduled time of arrival of the Mona’s Isle passed, requiring the Isle of Man Steam Packet Company to contact their Liverpool office to ensure that she had departed on time. This was duly confirmed and the King Orry, under the command of Capt. Gill, was coaled and despatched in order to locate the Mona’s Isle and give assistance. 
At 23:15hrs the Mona’s Isle was located by the King Orry, which then took her under tow and proceeded to Douglas. Passage was slow, and it was not until 05:00hrs the following morning that the two vessels arrived in Douglas; where many people had stayed on the Victoria Pier all night, anxious to receive news.
Whilst out of commission, the King Orry replaced the Mona’s Isle on the Liverpool schedule, and in turn she was replaced on the Fleetwood schedule by the Fenella.

Mona's Isle was structurally damaged in heavy seas in 1885. On passage from Douglas to Liverpool damage was done to one of her paddle wheels and they were later strengthened, with a set of new composite floats fitted in 1886. On 8 March 1887, the schooner Constance collided with Monas Isle at Liverpool and sank without loss of life.

In September 1892 she went aground at Scarlett Point, Castletown, while rounding the south of the Island, homeward bound from Dublin.

A contemporary report stated:

 In 1895 Mona's Isle was fitted with electric lighting, the consideration being £600. She was present on the south coast of England briefly in 1902, being on charter for the Fleet Review at Spithead for the coronation of King Edward VII.

War service 
Mona's Isle was sold to the Admiralty in 1915 and did not return to the company's fleet after the Great War. She was fitted out by Vickers in September, 1915, as a net-laying ship for anti-submarine work.

She was usually stationed at Harwich and did varied work, quite apart from net-laying. Perhaps her most noteworthy mission was to the wreck of a Dutch steamer that had been torpedoed and sunk beyond the Cork lightship off the southern Irish coast. It was known that the Dutchman had been carrying bullion, and the net-layer acted as base ship for the salvage operation. Gold valued at £86,000 was recovered, after which the paddle steamer made fast getaway from an area where German submarines were particularly menacing.

The Mona's Isle had a number of varied missions; she patrolled the west coast of Ireland, she assisted in rescue work from a sinking warship and she searched for survivors from two British submarines that had been lost.

Disposal 
After the end of the war she was not fit for reconditioning, and despite being offered for sale by the Admiralty, no bids were forthcoming. Mona's Isle was broken up by Thos. W. Ward at Morecambe in September 1919.

Official number and code letters 
Official numbers are issued by individual flag states. They should not be confused with IMO ship identification numbers. Mona's Isle had the UK Official Number 76304 and used the Code Letters P K F C .

References

Bibliography
 Chappell, Connery (1980). Island Lifeline T.Stephenson & Sons Ltd 

Ships of the Isle of Man Steam Packet Company
World War I auxiliary ships of the United Kingdom
1882 ships
Ferries of the Isle of Man
Steamships
Steamships of the United Kingdom
Paddle steamers of the United Kingdom
Merchant ships of the United Kingdom
World War I merchant ships of the United Kingdom
Ships built on the River Clyde